Guram Dolenjashvili (born 9 March 1943 in Kutaisi) is a Georgian painter often working in a monochrome technique. He is a Meritorious Artist of Georgia and an honorary member of Russian Academy of Arts (since 2004).

Dolenjashvili was born in Kutaisi. He graduated from the Tbilisi Academy of Arts in 1968 where he studied in the shop of Lado Grigolia. He mostly lived in Kutaisi but travel led to Russian North, White Sea, Kamchatka and Chukotka.  His works are exhibited in the Art Museum of Georgia, Tretyakov Gallery, Pushkin Museum, Russian Museum and many others. 

Many of his works are landscapes made in black and white, using a graphite pencil or etching with slightly surrealist shifting of reality still he is often considered a follower of traditions Russian realist landscapers of Ivan Shishkin and Yuly Klever.

Now, Guram signed the agreement with Raffian Art to produce limited editions of giclees.

Featured personal exhibitions 
 Tixi Bay, 1979
 Saint-Petersburg, 1984
 Tbilisi. 1988
 Moscow, Central House of Artists (TsDKh), 1996
 “Logovaz” at Tverskaya St., “Mercedes Benz”, Moscow, 1998
 Moscow, Foreign Trade Centre (Hammer Federation), 1998
 Moscow, Parliament of Russia Federation, 1999
 Moscow, The World Bank, 2000, 2001
 Moscow, The Directorate of Exhibition and Auctions, the RF of Ministry Culture, 2003

International exhibitions 
 XIII Biennial exhibition of easel painting, Yugoslavia, 1979
 Biennial of European Print (plate), Heidelberg, Germany, 1979
 “Intergrafika-80”, Kraków, Poland, 1980
 XIV Biennial exhibition of easel painting, Luibliana, Yugoslavia, 1981
 International Poster Exhibition, Moscow, 1982
 Biennial exhibition of easel painting, Muilouise, France, 1982
 XV Biennial exhibition of easel painting, Luibliana, Yugoslavia, 1983
 III Biennial exhibition of European Print (plate), Baden-Baden, Germany, 1983
 Triennial exhibition “Artists against War”, Maidanek, Poland, 1985
 Biennial exhibition of easel in Varna, Bulgaria, 1985
 (Ist Place — “Silver Plate” and diploma)
 II International Festival of Arts, Baghdad, Iraq, 1988
 III Biennial exhibition of easel painting in Bhopal, Matia-Pradesh, India, 1995
 II International Exhibition of easel painting, Kaliningrad (Kenigsberg), Russia 1996
 International Arts Fair “The Art of XX century”, Art-Manezh, Moscow, Russia, 1996
 I International Quadrienneal of graphics, Moscow, 1997
 V International Arts Exhibition “Palette”, Central House of Artists, Moscow, 1999
 International Arts Fair, Art-Manezh, Moscow, 2000
 III International Triennial  of printing graphic, Ufa, Bashkortostan, 2001

Other exhibitions and auctions 
 Magnum association, Moscow, 1993 (auction)
 Istoki Co., Moscow 1993-1994
 Cohem City, FRG, 1994, 1995, 1996
 “Russian village” at Niigata, Japan, 1995
 Russian Culture Days in Delhi, India, 1995
 “Russian Art Gallery at Vozdvizhenka”-personal exhibition, Moscow, 1996
 Kufstein City, Austria, 1996
 “Tetterode Grafik – 1997” contest, Holland (A Window to Europe, Moscow)
 “Russian Artists tribute to Moscow”, Moscow, 1997
 Gallery “World and colours”, London, England, 1999
 Gallery “Galina”, London, England, 1999
 Australia, EXPO-88
 France, 1977
 Sweden, 1984, 1985
 Great Britain, 1977, 1978
 Switzerland, 1985
 USA, 1978, 1980, 1982, 1984
 Arts Fair of the socialist countries 1985, 1986, 1987
 «InterArt-85», Poznan, Poland
 Austria, 1980, 1985
 «InterArt -86», Poznan, Poland
 FRG, 1983, 1985
 Los Angeles, USA, 1990 (auction)
 Czechoslovakia, 1984,  GDR, 1984
 Great Britain, “Art/London-91” (auction)

Museums 
 State Tretyakov gallery
 State Pushkin Museum
 The Bakhzadeh Museum, Dushanbe, Tajikistan
 State Oriental Arts Museum
 State Russian Museum
 Modern Art Museum, Cologne, Germany
 Arts Museum, Canton, Ohio, USA
 Chelyabinsk Picture Gallery
 New Orleans Museum, Louisiana, USA
 Museum of the Resistance, Brussels, Belgium
 North Kazakhstan Oblast Museum of Dodgy Collection from Gularto Glasnost
 People’s Museum, Poznan, Poland
 Poznan Bureau of Modern Arts, Poznan, Poland
 Slovak National Gallery, Bratislava, Slovakia
 Georgian National Museum, National Gallery
 Central Museum of Revolution, Moscow
 Tbilisi State Museum of Arts
 Kutaisi Picture Gallery, Georgia
 State Historical Museum, Kutaisi
 Bashkirskiy State Museum of Art of Nesterova
 Museum of Art of Tzjik Republic

References

Further reading
Альбом Г. Доленджашвили (G. Dolenjashvili Album), Moscow:2006,

External links
Paintings by Dolenjashvili
About Guram Dolenjashvili (Raffian Art)
"After the rain" by Dolenjashvili at Raffian Art

Painters from Georgia (country)
1943 births
Living people
People from Kutaisi